Acrocercops apicella is a moth of the family Gracillariidae, known from Guadalcanal and Rennell Island of the Solomon Islands. It was named by J.D. Bradley in 1957.

References

apicella
Moths of Oceania
Moths described in 1957